The Kurdistan Region parliamentary elections of 2013 took place on 21 September 2013. It was the fourth legislative election in Kurdistan Region since 1992. The candidates were competing for a total of 111 seats out of which 11 seats were reserved for minorities. According to the Iraqi High Electoral Commission, there were 366 female and 736 male candidates for the elections. A total of 2,653,743 people were eligible to vote throughout the three provinces of Erbil, Sulaymaniyah and Dohuk of which 74% cast their ballots.

Run-up
The legislative elections together with presidential and provincial were originally planned for September 21. However, in the months leading to the elections the parliament extended Massoud Barzani’s term for another two years. Meanwhile, IHEC delayed the provincial elections until November 21. Under Kurdish Election law political parties were allowed to campaign from August 28 until September 17th, four days before voting. The Peshmerga and police voted on September 19, in order for them to be able to guard the voting polls on September 21.

The election marked the first time the Kurdistan Democratic Party and the Patriotic Union of Kurdistan were running as individual parties since 1992. The Kurdistan Democratic Party was expected to win the most votes. The party has had a strong backing in the provinces of Duhok and Erbil and no challengers. The Patriotic Union of Kurdistan meanwhile was facing competition from the Movement for Change. The Movement for Change had in the previous elections secured a surprising 25 seats in Sulaymaniyah, which had until then been a stronghold for the Patriotic Union of Kurdistan. The Patriotic Union of Kurdistan also faced uncertainty due to internal conflicts and the absence of its leader Jalal Talabani who was recovering from a stroke.

Clashes
On 5 September, a gunman opened fire on a campaign rally by the Movement for Change in the city of Sulaymaniyah, wounding one person. In the same week, clashes broke out between the opposition Movement for Change and PUK and KDP supporters that led to 12 people, mostly policemen, being wounded.

Notable participating entities

Results 

No party won enough votes to form a government outright. The Kurdistan Democratic Party won the most votes in Erbil and Duhok. The province of Sulaymaniyah was heavily divided. The Movement for Change won the second most votes which made it the prime partner for the Kurdistan Democratic Party to form a coalition with. The Patriotic Union of Kurdistan, unexpectedly, lost more than a third of its seats.

The Patriotic Union of Kurdistan announced that it respected the results. Soon after the announcement high-ranking member of the party resigned accepting responsibility for the bad results. Both Islamists and socialists made gains. A total of 77 men and 34 women were elected.

Results by governorate

References

External links
 Official Full results

2013 elections in Iraq
2013 in Iraqi Kurdistan
2013